The Tony Award for Best Performance by a Featured Actress in a Musical has been presented since 1950. The award was not given at the first three Tony Award ceremonies. Nominees were not announced publicly until 1956.

Winners and nominees

1950s

1960s

1970s
{| class="wikitable" style="width:98%;"
|- style="background:#bebebe;"
! style="width:11%;"| Year
! style="width:27%;"| Actress
! style="width:33%;"| Musical
! style="width:29%;"| Character
|-
| rowspan="5" align="center"| 1970
|- style="background:#B0C4DE"
| Melba Moore
| Purlie
| Lutiebell Gussie Mae Jenkins
|-
| Bonnie Franklin
| rowspan="2"| Applause
| Bonnie the Gypsy
|-
| Penny Fuller
| Eve Harrington
|-
| Melissa Hart
| Georgy
| Meredith
|-
| rowspan="4" align="center"| 1971
|- style="background:#B0C4DE"
| Patsy Kelly
| No, No, Nanette
| Pauline
|-
| Barbara Barrie
| rowspan="2"| Company
| Sarah
|-
| Pamela Myers
| Marta
|-
| rowspan="5" align="center"| 1972
|- style="background:#B0C4DE"
| Linda Hopkins
| Inner City
| Various Characters
|-
| Adrienne Barbeau
| Grease
| Betty Rizzo
|-
| Bernadette Peters
| On the Town
| Hildy Esterhazy
|-
| Beatrice Winde
| Ain't Supposed to Die a Natural Death
|  Various Characters
|-
| rowspan="5" align="center"| 1973
|- style="background:#B0C4DE"
| Patricia Elliott
| A Little Night Music
| Countess Charlotte Malcolm
|-
| Hermione Gingold
| A Little Night Music
| Madame Armfeldt
|-
| Patsy Kelly
| Irene
| Mrs. O'Dare
|-
| Irene Ryan
| Pippin
| Berthe
|-
| rowspan="6" align="center"| 1974
|- style="background:#B0C4DE"
| Janie Sell
| Over Here!
| Mitzi
|-
| Leigh Beery
| Cyrano
| Roxana
|-
| Maureen Brennan
| rowspan="2"| Candide
| Cunégonde
|-
| June Gable
| The Old Lady
|-
| Ernestine Jackson
| Raisin
| Ruth Younger
|-
| rowspan="7" align="center"| 1975
|- style="background:#B0C4DE"
| Dee Dee Bridgewater
| The Wiz
| Glinda
|-
| Susan Browning
| Goodtime Charley
| Agnès Sorel
|-
| Zan Charisse
| Gypsy
| Louise
|-
| Taina Elg
| Where's Charley?
| Donna Lucia D'Alvadorez
|-
| Kelly Garrett
| The Night That Made America Famous
| Various Characters
|-
| Donna Theodore
| Shenandoah
| Ann Anderson
|-
| rowspan="5" align="center"| 1976
|- style="background:#B0C4DE"
| Kelly Bishop
| A Chorus Line
| Sheila Bryant
|-
| Priscilla Lopez
| A Chorus Line
| Diana Morales
|-
| Patti LuPone
| The Robber Bridegroom
| Rosamund Musgrove
|-
| Virginia Seidel
| Very Good Eddie
| Elsie Darling
|-
| rowspan="5" align="center"| 1977
|- style="background:#B0C4DE"
| Delores Hall
| Your Arms Too Short to Box with God
| Various Characters
|-
| Ellen Greene
| The Threepenny Opera
| Jenny
|-
| Millicent Martin
| rowspan="2"| Side by Side by Sondheim
| Various Characters
|-
| Julia McKenzie
| Various Characters
|-
| rowspan="5" align="center"| 1978
|- style="background:#B0C4DE"
| Nell Carter
| Ain't Misbehavin'
| Nell
|-
| Imogene Coca
| On the Twentieth Century
| Letitia Primrose
|-
| Ann Reinking
| Dancin'
| Various Characters
|-
| Charlayne Woodard
| ''Ain't Misbehavin| Charlayne
|-
| rowspan="5" align="center"| 1979|- style="background:#B0C4DE"
| Carlin Glynn
| The Best Little Whorehouse in Texas
| Mona Stangley
|-
| Joan Ellis
| The Best Little Whorehouse in Texas
| Shy
|-
| Millicent Martin
| King of Hearts
| Madame Madeleine
|-
| Maxine Sullivan
| My Old Friends
| Mrs. Cooper
|}

1980s

1990s

2000s

2010s

2020s

Win total
 2 Wins
 Judy Kaye
 Andrea Martin
 Audra McDonald

Nomination total

 5 Nominations
 Andrea Martin

 4 Nominations
 Laura Benanti

 3 Nominations
 Victoria Clark
 Judy Kaye
 Jane Krakowski
 Patti LuPone
 Mary Testa
 Karen Ziemba

 2 Nominations
 Tammy Blanchard
 Gretha Boston
 Barbara Cook
 Helen Gallagher
 Jayne Houdyshell
 Cady Huffman
 Patsy Kelly
 Judy Kuhn
 Marcia Lewis
 Priscilla Lopez
 Julienne Marie
 Millicent Martin
 Audra McDonald
 Mary Beth Peil
 Josephine Premice
 Chita Rivera
 Jennifer Simard
 Louise Troy
 Lillias White
 Mary Louise Wilson

Character win total
 2 Wins
 Carrie Pipperidge from Carousel
 Marge MacDougall from Promises, Promises

Character nomination total

 5 Nominations
 Louise from Gypsy

 3 Nominations
 Fraulein Schneider from Cabaret
 The Old Lady from Candide

 2 Nominations
 Anita from West Side Story
 Aunt Eller from Oklahoma!
 Berthe from Pippin
 Bloody Mary from South Pacific
 Carla Albanese from Nine
 Carrie Pipperidge from Carousel
 Gladys Bumps from Pal Joey
 Gladys Hotchkiss from The Pajama Game
 Hildy Esterhazy from On the Town and Jerome Robbins' Broadway
 Ilona Ritter from She Loves Me
 Jenny from The Threepenny Opera
 Liliane La Fleur from Nine
 Luisa Contini from Nine
 Madame Armfeldt from A Little Night Music
 Marge MacDougall from Promises, Promises
 Maria from West Side Story
 Nickie from Sweet Charity
 Peggy Sawyer from 42nd Street
 Queenie from Show Boat
 Sarah from Company
 Sofia Johnson from The Color Purple
 Trina from Falsettos

Multiple awards and nominationsActress who have been nominated multiple times in any acting categories'''

External links
 Internet Broadway Database Awards Archive
 Official Tony Awards Website Archive

Tony Awards
Theatre acting awards
Awards established in 1950
1950 establishments in the United States
Awards for actresses